Battle of Tallinn may refer to:
 Battle at the Iron Gate, a possible 1032 Novgorod failed naval attack near the Estonian stronghold.
 Battle of Lindanise, a 1219 Danish conquest of the Estonian stronghold in the Livonian Crusade.
 Siege of Tallinn, a 1221 failed Estonian siege of the Danish stronghold in the Livonian Crusade.
 Siege of Lindanise, a 1223 failed Estonian siege of the Danish stronghold in the Livonian Crusade.
 Siege of Lindanise, a 1223 failed Russian and Estonian siege of the Danish stronghold in the Livonian Crusade.
 Battle of Lindanise, a 1227 Livonian Brothers of the Sword capture of the Danish stronghold in the Livonian Crusade.
 Battle of Sõjamäe, a 1343 Livonian Order attack on Estonian forces near the town in the St. George's Night Uprising.
 Battle of Jerusalem Hill, two 1560 de facto independent Reval attacks against Muscovite forces near the town in the Livonian War.
 Battle of Reval, a 1569 Danish and Lübecker naval bombardment and sack of Reval Harbour in the Livonian War.
 Siege of Reval, a 1570–1571 failed "Livonian" and Muscovite siege of the Swedish town in the Livonian War.
 Siege of Reval, a 1577 failed Muscovite siege of the Swedish town in the Livonian War.
 Battle of Reval, a 1602 Polish-Lithuanian attack on Swedish forces near the town in the Polish–Swedish War (1600–11).
 Siege of Reval, a 1710 Russian siege to capture the Swedish town.
 Battle of Reval, a 1790 failed Swedish naval attack on the Russian town in the Russo-Swedish War (1788–1790).
 Bombing of Tallinn in World War II, 1941–1944 German and Soviet aerial bombing raids of the city.
 Two battles during the Summer War of World War II:
 Battle of Tallinn, a 1941 German capture of the city from Soviet forces.
 Soviet evacuation of Tallinn, a 1941 naval evacuation of the city and the Gulf of Finland.
 Tallinn Offensive, a 1944 offensive to retake the city from German forces in World War II.
 Attempt to restore independence, a 1944 failed Estonian attempt to recapture the city from German forces and to hold it against Soviet forces.
 Battle of Tallinn, the final battle of that offensive.